The Bibliotheca or Myriobiblos (Μυριόβιβλος, "Ten Thousand Books") was a ninth-century work of Byzantine Patriarch of Constantinople Photius, dedicated to his brother and composed of 279 reviews of books which he had read.

Overview
Bibliotheca was not meant to be used as a reference work, but was widely used as such in the 9th century, and is one of the first Byzantine works that could be called an encyclopedia. Reynolds and Wilson call it "a fascinating production, in which Photius shows himself the inventor of the book-review," and say its "280 sections... vary in length from a single sentence to several pages". The works he notes are mainly Christian and pagan authors from the 5th century BC to his own time in the 9th century AD. Almost half the books mentioned no longer survive. These would have disappeared in the Sack of Constantinople by the Fourth Crusade in 1204, in the final Fall of Constantinople to the Ottomans in 1453, or in the following centuries of Ottoman rule, during which wealth and literacy contracted dramatically in the subordinate Greek community.

Possible Abbasid link 

Some older scholarship had speculated that Bibliotheca might have been composed in Baghdad at the time of Photius' embassy to the Abbasid court, since many of the mentioned works are rarely cited during the period before Photius, i.e. the so-called Byzantine "Dark Ages," (c. 630 – c.800), and since it was known that the Abbasids were interested in translating Greek science and philosophy. However, modern specialists of the period, such as Paul Lemerle, have pointed out that this cannot be the case, since Photius himself clearly states in his preface and postscript to the Bibliotheca that after he was chosen to take part in the embassy, he sent his brother a summary of the works he had read previously "since the time that I learned how to understand and evaluate literature," i.e. from his youth. A further difficulty with supposing that Bibliotheca was composed during rather than before the embassy, besides Photius' own explicit statement, is that the majority of the works in Bibliotheca are of Christian patristic theology, and most of the secular works are histories, grammars, and works of literature, particularly rhetoric, rather than works of philosophy or science, and the Abbasids showed no interest in having Greek history or Greek high literature like rhetoric translated, nor were they interested in translating Greek Christian works. Their interest in Greek texts was confined almost exclusively to science, philosophy and medicine. In fact, "there is almost no overlap (other than some Galen, Dioscorides, and Vindonius Anatolius) between the inventory of secular works in Photius's Bibliotheca and those works that were translated into Arabic" in the Abbasid period.

Editions 
 Editio princeps (in Greek): David Hoeschel, Augsburg, 1601.  Modern critical edition by R. Henry.

Contents

See also
Byzantine philosophy
Greek Orthodox Christianity
History of the Byzantine Empire

References

External links
Photius, Bibliotheca at The Tertullian Project
Photius, Bibliotheca (original text in Greek)

9th-century books
Byzantine Greek encyclopedias
Books of literary criticism
9th century in the Byzantine Empire